Phyllocnistis psychina is a moth of the family Gracillariidae. It is known from Western Australia.

References

Phyllocnistis
Endemic fauna of Australia